Bureau is a surname. Notable people with the surname include:

André Bureau (1935–2019), Canadian lawyer and communications executive
Jacques Bureau (1860–1933), Canadian politician
Jean Bureau (c. 1390–1463) French artillery commander at the end of the hundred years war
Jean Pierre Roman Bureau (1770–1851), French-born American co-founder of Gallipolis, Ohio and member of the Ohio General Assembly
Gaspard Bureau ( died 1469) French artillery officer at the end of the hundred years war, and brother of Jean
Louis Édouard Bureau (1830–1918), French physician and botanist
Marc Bureau (ice hockey) (born 1966), Canadian ice hockey player
Marc Bureau (politician) (born 1955), Canadian politician; mayor of Gatineau
Stéphan Bureau (born 1964), Canadian television journalist

French-language surnames